KAJI-LP is a radio station which broadcasts out of Palm Desert, California on 95.3 FM.

History 

KAJI-LP began broadcasting on November 19, 2014. It is licensed by the American Jazz Institute.

References

External links

Palm Desert, California
Jazz radio stations in the United States
Radio stations established in 2017
2017 establishments in California
AJI-LP
AJI-LP